The Tohono Oʼodham Nation is the collective government body of the Tohono Oʼodham tribe in the United States. These lands are located within the Sonoran Desert of south central Arizona and border the Mexico–United States border for  along its southern border. The Nation is organized into 11 local districts and employs a tripartite system of government. Sells is the Nation's largest community and functions as its capital. The Nation has approximately 34,000 enrolled members, the majority of whom live off of the reservations.

History
In 1874, President of the United States Ulysses S. Grant signed an executive order creating the San Xavier Indian Reservation, surrounding the 18th century Mission San Xavier del Bac. In 1882, President Chester A. Arthur signed an executive order creating the Gila Bend Indian Reservation as additional lands for the Tohono Oʼodham people. In 1916, a third reservation was created by executive order with Indian Oasis (now named Sells, Arizona) as its headquarters. In 1937, The Tohono Oʼodham Nation, then called the Papagos Tribe of Arizona, adopted their first constitution.

In 1960, the Army Corps of Engineers completed construction of the Painted Rock Dam on the Gila River. The area lost by the tribe contained a  farm and several communities. Residents were relocated to a  parcel of land named San Lucy Village, near Gila Bend, Arizona. In January 1986, the enrolled members of the three reservations adopted a new tribal constitution that changed the tribe name from Papago Tribe of Arizona to the Tohono Oʼodham Nation and adopted a three-branch form of government. Also in 1986, the federal government and the Nation approved a settlement in which the Nation agreed to give up its legal claims in exchange for $30,000,000 and the right to add replacement land to its reservation.

In 2009, the tribe announced that it had purchased approximately  near Glendale, Arizona. The city of Glendale and the Gila River Indian Community opposed attempts to develop the land though court challenges and supporting a measure passed by the Arizona House of Representatives which would allow the city of Glendale to incorporate land owned by the tribe, thereby making the land ineligible for inclusion within the reservation. , after a change of heart, the City of Glendale has been negotiating with the Nation over its proposed West Valley casino. The McCain-Franks bill, designed to prohibit the Glendale project and – in the process – would have changed federal law by unilaterally repealing critical parts of the Gila Bend Indian Reservation Lands Replacement Act, which was passed to settle a dispute over federal flooding of tribal reservation lands.

In 2009, the Nation acquired  of land near Why, Arizona with the intention of eventually creating a new district of the Tohono Oʼodham Nation for the Hia C-eḍ Oʼodham. On October 30, 2012, a new tribal law created the Hia-Ced District as the new 12th district of the Tohono Oʼodham Nation. On April 25, 2015 the Hia-Ced District was dissolved by referendum vote, returning the Nation to its original configuration of 11 districts.

People

Most Tohono Oʼodham people live in the United States. However, a small number are located across the international border in northwestern Mexico. The Tohono Oʼodham Nation speaks a common language, Oʼodham, which is the 10th most-spoken indigenous language in the United States. The people are nominally Catholic however the Nation's schools teach native language and culture.

The Nation has a population of approximately 34,000 enrolled members. The majority of the Nation's members live off the reservations. The main reservation, Tohono Oʼodham Indian Reservation, has a resident population of approximately 11,000 people. The San Xavier Indian Reservation has a resident population of 1,200 people. The Gila Bend Indian Reservation has a total population of approximately 1,700 people, and Florence Village has a population of approximately 195 people. The remaining approximate 14,600 members live off the reservations.

Geography
The lands of the Nation are located within the Sonoran Desert in south central Arizona. The Nation's lands are located in areas of a series of parallel mountains and valleys. The vegetation is consistent with other areas on the Sonoran Desert. Saguaro cactus, Cholla, prickly pear, palo verde, velvet mesquite, whitethorn acacia, desert ironwood and willow are the dominant vegetation in the landscape. The landscape is interspersed with plains and mountains. These include the Quinlan and Baboquivari Mountains, which include Kitt Peak, the Kitt Peak National Observatory and telescopes as well as Baboquivari Peak.

Sells, Arizona is the Nation's largest community and functions as the capital. The Tohono Oʼodham Nation occupies four separate pieces of land for a combined area of  making it the second largest Native American land holding in the United States. The lands include, the main reservation, the Gila Bend Reservation, San Xavier Reservation, and Florence Village. The San Xavier reservation is the second largest land base, and contains  just south of Tucson. With the 1853 Gadsden Purchase, the territory of the Tohono Oʼodham was split between the United States and Mexico. There is no reservation established for the Tohono Oʼodham people in Mexico, thus the Nation's southern border is the Mexico–United States border.

Border issues

Pre-contact to 1900 
Prior to colonization, the O'odham migrated along a north–south axis in a "two village" system, rotating between summer and winter settlements. These migrations formed the foundation of their subsistence economies and enabled religious pilgrimages. This pattern continued throughout Apache, Spanish, and American expansion, but shifted with the re-drawing of boundaries that followed the Mexican–American War.  At the Border of Empires: The Tohono O'odham, Gender, and Assimilation, 1880–1934. Tucson, AZ: University of Arizona Press, 2013. Unlike aboriginal groups along the U.S.-Canada border, the Tohono Oʼodham were not offered dual citizenship when the US drew a border across their lands in 1853 by the Gadsden Purchase. The Treaty of Guadalupe Hidalgo did not specify the rights of the Oʼodham in crossing the international border. The population was split between Mexico and the United States, however, after the treaty the U.S. government guaranteed that the Oʼodham freedom of movement would be protected. For decades, members of the nation continued to move freely across the current international boundary. Throughout this time, tribal members traveled and migrated to work, participate in religious ceremonies, keep medical appointments in Sells, Arizona and visit relatives. The O'odham were deliberate in attending their religious festivals, and they would leave their employers for two to four weeks to travel to Magdalena, Sonora. Oʼodham labor was so valued that employers began to drive their O'odham employees to the festivals rather than lose 4–8 days of labor while tribal members traveled the 140–200 miles by wagon. The end of the 19th century and beginning of the 20th saw a decline in the subsistence economies of the Oʼodham, and after the Bureau of Indian Affairs drilled wells for the Oʼodham, their need for constant migration declined. Despite these changes, the Oʼodham continued to move through the region with their families, working as hired hands on farms, mines, and ranches where work appeared.

1900–2000 
The pre-contact legacy and economic lifestyles of the Oʼodham gave them a "transnational identity", but Indigenous conflicts on the Mexico–United States barrier arose. Land theft and forced assimilation decreased the numbers of southern Oʼodham and alienated them from their northern counterparts. By 1910, it was estimated that only 1,000 Oʼodham remained in Mexico. The disparities in wealth between the two sides also led to cultural shifts. The traditional practice of lending between Oʼodham decreased as many Arizona Oʼodham felt that those on the Mexican side would not be able to pay loans back. During WWI concerns were raised about the proximity of the Oʼodham to the border, but the U.S. government ignored requests for additional military presence and trans-border smuggling thrived in the 1910s and 1920s. This included liquor, food, and guns. The War Department attempted to halt these illegal activities, but the reporting system on such a wide area of land was slow and ineffective. Ironically, the Oʼodham were accused of participating in the Yaquis' international weapons smuggling. As Mexicans were deported during the Great Depression, the Mexican government gave them Oʼodham tribal lands. Notions of isolation were further intensified during WWII as the U.S. Mexico border was militarized to protect against potential invasions via the Sea of Cortez, and tribal lands in Sonora were privatized to increase government production. In 1977 the Los Angeles Times published a scathing article, writing that Mexican O'odham were taking advantage of medical facilities and welfare checks on the Arizona side of the border. An increase in militarization occurred again in the 1980s and 1990s, and further inhibited the ability of tribal members to travel back and forth and slowed migration. The Mexican government made gestures to improve the condition of the O'odham in Mexico by opening the office of the National Indian Institute, but the office struggled with inadequate resources and institutionalized corruption. In the 1980s, O'odham in Sonora responded to decades of land theft and bureaucratic failure by staging an occupation at the "weak and underfunded" National Indian Institute offices. the tribal constitution ratified in 1986 reads: "All members of the Tohono O'odham Nation shall be given equal opportunity to participate in the economic resources and activities of the Tohono O'odham Nation." However, many tribal members felt that these promises were not guaranteed for them.  At the end of the decade, O'odham on the Mexican side of the border wrote an "open letter" to O'odham on the American side. In the letter they stated: "our human rights and aboriginal rights have slowly been violated or disappeared in Mexico." This articulated the concerns among many Oʼodham about the growing international divide and population loss in Sonora. In its 1990 census, the government of Mexico recorded no Oʼodham living in Sonora.

2000–present 
The O'odham saw a subsequent rise in illegal crossing and smuggling through tribal lands as the surrounding security increased. In 2003 the Nation hosted a Congressional hearing on the illegal activity occurring on tribal lands. In the hearing tribal leaders and law enforcement officers testified of "incidents of cross-border violence, and even incursions by Mexican military personnel in support of drug smugglers." Along with the cross-border violence, tribal members continued to experience other social and legal consequences from the border. Tribal members born in Mexico or who have insufficient documentation to prove U.S. birth or residency, found themselves trapped in a remote corner of Mexico, with no access to the tribal centers only tens of miles away. In 2001, a bill was proposed that would give citizenship to all Tohono Oʼodham, but the bill was forgotten in the aftermath of 9/11. Since then, bills have repeatedly been introduced in Congress to solve the "one people-two country" problem by granting U.S. citizenship to all enrolled members of the Tohono Oʼodham, but so far their sponsors have not gained passage. Opponents of granting U.S. citizenship to all enrolled members of the Nation include concerns that many births on the reservation have been informally recorded, and the records are susceptible to easy alteration or falsification. O'odham can cross the border with Tribal Identification Cards, but these can be denied at the border and legal documentation on the reservation is poor. Separation from family members and detainment are possibilities for O'odham crossing into the United States.

Today, the tribal government incurs extra costs due to the proximity of the U.S.-Mexico border. There are also associated social problems. In an area of acute poverty offers from smugglers for Oʼodham to assist in illegal activity are common, and in some instances drug traffickers have purchased Oʼodham land along the border. Many of the thousands of Mexican nationals, and other nationals illegally crossing the U.S. border to work in U.S. agriculture or to smuggle illicit drugs into the U.S., seek emergency assistance from the Tohono O'odham police when they become dehydrated or are stranded. On the ground, border patrol emergency rescue and tribal EMTs coordinate and communicate. The tribe and the state of Arizona pay a large proportion of the bills for border-related law enforcement and emergency services. The former governor of Arizona, Janet Napolitano, and Tohono Oʼodham government leaders have requested repeatedly that the federal government repay the state and the tribe for the costs of border-related emergencies. Tribe Chairman Ned Norris Jr. has complained about the lack of reimbursement for border enforcement.

Citing the impact it would have on wildlife and on the tribe's members, Tohono O'odham tribal leaders have expressed opposition in a series of official statements to President Donald Trump's stated plan to build a wall along the U.S.–Mexico border. While the 1986 Tohono O'odham constitution gives the tribe sovereignty over their territory, this is nonetheless subject to the plenary power of Congress. Approximately 2,000 members live in Mexico, and a wall would physically separate them from members in the United States. Most of the 25,000 Tohono Oʼodham today live in southern Arizona, but several thousand of the Oʼodham, many related by kinship, also live in northern Sonora, Mexico. Today, many tribal members still make an annual pilgrimage to San Xavier del Bac and Magdalena, Sonora, during St. Francis festivities to commemorate St. Francis Xavier and St. Francis of Assisi, founder of the Franciscan Order.

Integrated fixed towers 
Integrated fixed towers (IFTs) are solar-powered structures that integrates high technology, such as infrared and video machinery, to provide long-range, 360-degree, all-weather surveillance along the border. The proposed layout and size of the IFTs is said to range between 120 and 180 feet high, with each tower having its own equipment such as generators, propane tanks, and equipment shelters. The lot size of each tower varies between 2,500 square feet and 25,600 square feet, plus a fence that encompasses up to 10,000 feet. The radio technology of the tower permits the machine to be able to detect movement as far as from a 9.3-mile radius and vehicles from an 18.6 mile radius, while the long-range camera allows for video footage from 13.5 miles away.

During March 2014, in efforts to raise border security, the United States Customs and Border Protection contracted a project with Elbit Systems of America to design and manufacture Integrated Fixed Towers (IFTs) along the Arizona border. The competition for a $145 million contract lasted between major defense contractors such as General Dynamics, Lockheed Martin, and Raytheon. This contract gave Elbit jurisdiction to implement these structures to an unknown amount of sites at anonymous locations and the power for both the company and Border Patrol to deeply monitor the border. Originally, it was stated that there would be sixteen IFTs placed along the southern border of Mexico and western border of the Organ Pipe Cactus National Monument. In an article published in March 2018, it revealed that there are 52 IFTs set in place along Arizona's southern border.

Before the implementation of IFTs, the government had been using SBInets. These machines were intended to serve the same purpose as the towers, while also allowing Border Patrol agents to observe information from a common operational picture. However, the technology and functionality of SBInets did not meet expectations and costs began to exceed the budget by $1.4 billion. This eventually led to a shift towards IFTs.

The implementation of these towers will aid Border Patrol in monitoring illegal crossings and any suspicious activity that occurs near the border. Although the towers would benefit Border Patrol in controlling illegal activities, for the Tohono O'odham nation, the integration of these structures will result in further territorial disputes and invasion of privacy. The rapidly increasing surveillance and security that is being brought to the borderlands has instilled fear within Indigenous communities. The existence of IFTs have begun to interfere with the spiritual rituals and daily routines of the Tohono O'odham nations. Tribes such as the Tohono O'odham no longer have the freedom to cross the border to visit their families or explore outside of their homes without risk of being scrutinized by agents. Even with set boundaries and size guidelines for the towers, the current IFTs have exceeded the established range and are beginning to occupy parts of O'odham territory. Moreover, the growing number of towers along the border has brought increased numbers of Border Patrol agents: 1,500 positioned in three districts that control the reservation.

Administration
The Nation is organized into 11 local districts. Nine districts are located on the Tohono Oʼodham Indian Reservation with the Gila Bend and San Xavier reservations, which are separated from the main reserve, making up the other two.

The government of the Tohono Oʼodham Nation is made up of three branches: executive, judicial, and legislative. The executive includes the chairmen and vice chairmen of the 11 districts, the judicial is composed of the judges and courts, and the legislative consists of the tribal council representatives from each of the administrative districts. As a whole, the Tohono Oʼodham Nation is governed by a democratically elected chairperson and legislative council. All of the reservations are overseen administratively by a central government located in Sells. As of 2019, the Nation's current Chairman is Ned Norris, Jr. and the Vice Chair is Wayvalene Romero. The Nation's Chief Justice is Violet Lui-Frank, and the Legislative Chairman is Timothy Joaquin Gu Achi.

The Tohono Oʼodham Nation operates its own educational system, which includes Tohono Oʼodham Community College, a fire department and several recreation centers, a health center, a nursing home, and a public utilities company.

Economy
Economic support for the tribe comes from a variety of sources. Some of the Tohono Oʼodham still farm or engage in subsistence ranching. The tribe sells and leases copper mineral rights to support itself. Gambling from the three casinos that the tribe operates has become the major source of support for the tribe in terms of revenue and jobs creation. The tribe operates the Tohono Oʼodham Utility Authority a tribal firm established in 1970 to provide electric and water service to the reservation. Basket weaving remains an economic pursuit; the tribe produces more basketry than any other tribe in the United States.

Notes

References

Bibliography

External links

Tohono O'odham Nation
American Indian reservations in Arizona